The 2017 Maldives FA Cup Final is the 29th Final of the Maldives FA Cup.

Route to the final

TC Sports

New Radiant

Match

Details

Match rules
90 minutes.
30 minutes of extra-time if necessary.
Penalty shoot-out if scores still level.
Maximum of three substitutions.

See also
2017 Maldives FA Cup

References

Maldives FA Cup finals
FA Cup